Hannes Gnauck (born 8 August 1991) is a German politician for the AfD and since 2021 member of the Bundestag, the federal diet.

Life and politics 

Gnack was born 1991 in Prenzlau and was elected to the Bundestag in 2021.

References 

Living people
1991 births
Alternative for Germany politicians
Members of the Bundestag 2021–2025
21st-century German politicians